XHUTX-FM is a radio station in Tlaxcala City, Tlaxcala, Mexico. Broadcasting on 99.5 FM from a transmitter on Cerro Ostol, XHUTX is owned by the Autonomous University of Tlaxcala and broadcasts a university radio format known as Radio Universidad.

History
After obtaining its permit in July 2000, Radio Universidad officially came to air on January 7, 2002, operating from 7am to 10pm. The station currently has programming from 6am to 10pm.

In 2015, XHUTX-FM was approved for a power increase from 3 kW to 10.

References

Radio stations in Tlaxcala
Mass media in Tlaxcala City
University radio stations in Mexico